Linguistic Inquiry is a peer-reviewed academic journal in generative linguistics published by the MIT Press since 1970. Ever since its foundation, it has been edited by Samuel Jay Keyser. Many seminal linguistic articles first appeared on its pages. The volumes since 1998 are available online via the site of the publisher.

External links
Official website
Linguistic Inquiry at Project MUSE

Linguistics journals
MIT Press academic journals
Quarterly journals
English-language journals
Publications established in 1970